Friends with benefits most specifically refers to friends with benefits relationships, meaning otherwise platonic friends who engage in casual sexual relationships with each other, and may also refer to:

Film and television
 Friends with Benefits (film), a 2011 film directed by Will Gluck
 Friends with Benefits (telenovela), a telenovela planned for 2007 but canceled 
 Friends with Benefits (TV series), a 2011 American television sitcom
 Friends (With Benefits), a 2009 independent comedy-drama film
 "Friends with Benefits", an episode of the telenova Fashion House
 Friends with Benefits, the working title of the film No Strings Attached

Music
 "Friends with Benefits" (song), a 2016 song by KSI and MNDM from the extended play Jump Around
 Friends with Benefit, a 2006 CD soundtrack from the TV series One Tree Hill

See also
 "Friend with Benefit", an episode of the animated television series The Simpsons
 "Friends Without Benefits", an episode of the animated comedy series Family Guy